CELPA (El Chamical) (Centro de Experimentación y Lanzamiento de Proyectiles Autopropulsados) was a rocket launch site in Argentina, near El Chamical, in the La Rioja Province. The launch site was in service between 1963 and 1973 and was mainly used for launching rockets of the types Centaure, Judi Dart, Orión, Rigel and Boosted Dart. A second CELPA compound was built in 1964 in Mar Chiquita, north of Mar del Plata, under the name of CELPA Atlántico.

See also
CELPA (Mar Chiquita)

External links
 Launch chronology 1962-74, at Astronautix.com
 Details, at GlobalSecurity.org
 History, at Stratocat.com.ar

Space programme of Argentina
Rocket launch sites in Argentina
Science and technology in Argentina
Government of Argentina
La Rioja Province, Argentina